Gurju Khatun (Gurji-xatuni) (fl. 1237-1286) was a Georgian royal princess from Bagrationi dynasty and principal consort of Sultanate of Rum being favorite wife of sultan Kaykhusraw II, whom she married after the death of Muhammad II of Khwarazm in 1237. After his death in 1246 she married the Anatolian strongman Pervane. She was the mother of sultan Kayqubad II and patron to Rumi.

Her title Gurju Khatun means "Georgian Lady" in Turkic languages.

Life
She was born as Tamar (Tamari) and had a biblical name popular in Kingdom of Georgia and was named after her grandmother Tamar the King.

Gurju Khatun was the daughter of (female) King Rusudan of Georgia and the Seljuk prince Ghias ad-din, a grandson of Kilij Arslan II.

She was a sister of King David VI of Georgia.

Like most Georgians, Tamar initially remained an Eastern Orthodox Christian but is known to have converted to Islam at a later point, after unproven accusations (by her own mother) of a secret affair between her and her cousin David Ulu, which put an end to previously harmonious relationship with her husband. She was reportedly beaten by him and ordered to leave her previous faith. He only let her choose which denomination of Islam she wanted to convert to. Gurju Khatun chose Sufism. It is said that the sun on the Seljuk coins of that time symbolizes Tamar, while the lion stands for the sultan himself. This emblem, known as shir-u hurshid (Lion and Sun), later became widespread in the Islamic world (though its origins date back to much earlier times). After the death of Kaykhusraw in 1246, the government of the sultanate was seized by the Pervane Mu‘in al-Din Suleyman who married Gurju Khatun.

She is known to have patronized science and art, and to have been on friendly terms with the famous Sufi poet Rumi in particular. She also sponsored the construction of the poet’s tomb in Konya.

References

External links 

რატომ გააწკეპლინა გურჯი ხათუნის მეუღლემ მოლა ნასრედინი და რატომ განარისხა რუსუდან მეფე მისმა ქალიშვილმა ეკა სალაღაია, 2010-06-03
What is behind the sun and lion figure? 

13th-century women
Bagrationi dynasty of the Kingdom of Georgia
Converts to Islam from Eastern Orthodoxy
Former Georgian Orthodox Christians
Princesses from Georgia (country)
People from the Sultanate of Rum
13th-century people from Georgia (country)
Muslims from Georgia (country)
Rumi

Remarried royal consorts